The Doubledogdare Stakes is a Grade III American Thoroughbred horse race for fillies and mares that are four years old or older, over a distance of a mile and a sixteenth on the dirt held annually in April at Keeneland Race Course in Lexington, Kentucky.  The event currently carries a purse of $300,000.

History

The race was named for Doubledogdare, the filly who gave Claiborne Farm their first major stakes win at Keeneland in the 1955 Alcibiades Stakes. Doubledogdare went on to be voted that year's American Co-Champion Two-Year-Old Filly and returned to Keeneland in 1956 to win the Spinster Stakes and would earn American Champion Three-Year-Old Filly honors.

The inaugural running of the event was on 28 October 1992 as a seven furlong event with Jeano the second favorite defeating the favorite Erica's Dream winning by a nose in a time of 1:22.61. Jeano was victorious once again in 1994 to become the races only two-time winner.

In 1995 the event was not scheduled and in 1996 the event was to be held during the Spring meeting but was cancelled after it failed to draw enough entries.

In 1997 the event was scheduled again for the spring meeting held in April, but was run on turf at a distance of five and a half furlongs. The winner Singing Heart set a new Keeneland course record of 1:02.40.

The following year the event was moved back to the dirt track and was run over a distance of mile and a sixteenth.

In 2007 the event was upgraded to Grade III status and that year the event was run on the synthetic Polytrack surface. In 2015 Keeneland reverted to a dirt surface.

The event was not held 2020 during Keeneland's spring meeting which was moved to July and shortened due to the COVID-19 pandemic in the United States.

The 1999 U.S. Champion Three-Year-Old Filly Silverbulletday began her four year old campaign in this event. The event attracted only five entrants with two scratching before the start of the race. Silverbulletday started an overwhelming 3-10 odds-on favorite in the three horse race narrowly defeating Roza Robata by a neck.

Records
Speed record:  
 miles – 1:41.20 Lu Ravi (1999)

Margins
12 lengths – Pool Land (2006)
Most wins
 2 – Jeano  (1992, 1994)

Most wins by a jockey
 6 – John Velazquez (2005, 2006, 2011, 2015, 2017, 2022)

Most wins by a trainer
 5– Todd A. Pletcher (2005, 2006, 2011, 2017, 2022)

Most wins by an owner
 2 – Frances A. Genter (1992, 1994)
 2 – Sam-Son Farm (2002, 2015)
 2 – Stonestreet Stables (2018, 2019)

Winners

Legend:

See also

 List of American and Canadian Graded races

External links 
 2021 Keeneland Media Guide

References

Graded stakes races in the United States
Grade 3 stakes races in the United States
Flat horse races for four-year-old fillies
Mile category horse races for fillies and mares
Recurring sporting events established in 1992
Keeneland horse races
1992 establishments in Kentucky